A strand swamp or strand is a type of swamp in Florida that forms a linear drainage channel on flatlands. A forested wetland ecological habitat, strands occur on land areas with high water tables where the lack of slope prevents stream formation. Strands are more linear than the cypress dome swamps that form in more rounded depressions and are fairly similar to floodplain swamps that form further north along streams and rivers.

For the most part, strand swamps occur south of Lake Okeechobee.

Strand swamps are often dominated by bald cypress (Taxodium distichum). Shallower strand swamps may contain pond cypress (Taxodium ascendens). When either of these trees dominate, the strand is known as a "cypress strand". Outside of protected areas, most old-growth cypress trees in Florida along streams or lakes have been harvested for their rot-resistant wood.

Beneath a strand swamp are layers of peat. Established strand swamps with a large amount of vegetation have deep peat layers. These deep peat layers can serve as a wick to draw water from underground into the swamp during droughts.

List of species
Undisturbed strand swamps support a number of plant species:

Epiphytes and vines
 white twinevine (Sarcostemma clausum)
 common wild-pine (Tillandsia fasciculata)
 eastern poison ivy (Toxicodendron radicans)
Herbs
 giant leather fern (Acrostichum danaeifolium)
 waterhyssops (Bacopa spp.)
 toothed midsorus fern (Blechnum serrulatum)
 sawgrass (Cladium jamaicense)
 string lily (Crinum americanum)
 royal fern (Osmunda regalis var. spectabilis)

Shrubs
 red maple (Acer rubrum)
 pond apple (Annona glabra)
 common buttonbush (Cephalanthus occidentalis)
 strangler fig (Ficus aurea)
 sweetbay (Magnolia virginiana)
 wax myrtle (Myrica cerifera)
 swamp bay (Persea palustris)
 swamp laurel oak (Quercus laurifolia)
 myrsine (Rapanea punctata)
 Florida royal palm (Roystonea regia)
 cabbage palm (Sabal palmetto)
 coastalplain willow (Salix caroliniana)

Strand swamps are also home to a number of animals, including Florida redbelly turtle (Pseudemys nelsoni), wood stork (Mycteria americana), wild turkey (Meleagris gallopavo), Florida black bear (Ursus americanus floridanus), and the endangered Florida panther.

References

Natural history of Florida
Plant communities of Florida
Swamps of Florida